Tatiana Birshtein or Tat'yana Maksimovna Birshtein (Russian:Татья́на Макси́мовна Бирште́йн, 20 December 1928 – 23 February 2022) was a Russian molecular scientist. Birshtein specialised in the physics of polymers. In 2007 she was given the L'Oréal-UNESCO Award for Women in Science.

Life and career
Birshtein was born in Leningrad (now Saint Petersburg) in 1928. She attended Leningrad State University.

Birshtein specialised in the theoretical physics of polymers in Saint Petersburg at the  Institute of Macromolecular Compounds of the Russian Academy of Sciences. This institution had been created as part of Professor Mikhail Volkenstein's 1950s Leningrad school of polymer science. The institution was synonymous with Birshtein and she is said to have dedicated her life to science.

She has published extensively on polymers, DNA stability, micelle structure, as well as structures of organic molecules.

On 22 February 2007, she was awarded $100,000, when she was given the L'Oréal-UNESCO Award for Women in Science. The award was for her "contribution to the understanding of the shapes, sizes and motions of large molecules."

Birshtein died on 23 February 2022, at the age of 93.

References

1928 births
2022 deaths
20th-century Russian chemists
20th-century Russian physicists
20th-century Russian women scientists
21st-century Russian women scientists
Russian physical chemists
Soviet physicists
Russian women physicists
Russian women chemists
L'Oréal-UNESCO Awards for Women in Science laureates
Honoured Scientists of the Russian Federation
Scientists from Saint Petersburg
Soviet physical chemists
Soviet women scientists